Michael Guptill-Bunce (born 7 April 1989) is a New Zealand cricketer who plays for Auckland. He made his Twenty20 debut for Auckland on 4 December 2016 in the 2016–17 Super Smash.

He was the leading run-scorer in the 2017–18 Plunket Shield season for Auckland, with 517 runs in ten matches. In June 2018, he was awarded a contract with Auckland for the 2018–19 season. In September 2018, he was named in the Auckland Aces' squad for the 2018 Abu Dhabi T20 Trophy.

He is the cousin of fellow opener, Martin Guptill.

See also
 List of Auckland representative cricketers

References

External links
 

1989 births
Living people
New Zealand cricketers
Auckland cricketers
Cricketers from Auckland
People educated at Saint Kentigern College